The 1988 Australian Drivers' Championship was a CAMS sanctioned national motor racing title which was awarded to the winner of the 1988 Australian Formula 2 Championship. The winning driver received the 1988 CAMS Gold Star and is recognised by CAMS as the winner of both the 43rd Australian Drivers' Championship and the 21st Australian Formula 2 Championship. 1988 was the second and last year in which the Australian Drivers' Championship was contested by Australian Formula 2 cars, this being an interim arrangement between the demise of Formula Mondial in Australia at the end of 1986 and the introduction of Formula Holden in 1989.

New South Wales driver Rohan Onslow won the first of his two Australian Drivers' Championships and his only Australian Formula 2 Championship driving a Cheetah Mk.8 Volkswagen and a Ralt RT30 Volkswagen. Queensland driver Derek Pingel (Ralt RT30 Volkswagen) finished second with Barry Ward (Ralt RT30 Volkswagen) placed third. Onslow and Neil Israel (Magnum 863 Volkswagen) each attained two round wins with single victories scored by Pingel, Ward and factory Nissan Touring Car driver Glenn Seton, who drove a Nissan Pulsar powered Ralt RT4 in two rounds of the championship. Seton's win at Adelaide International Raceway would be the only win for a car powered by an engine other than a Volkswagen Golf unit during the two years in which Australian Formula 2 cars contested the Australian Drivers' Championship.

Race calendar
The championship was contested over a seven-round series with one race per round.

Points system
Championship points were awarded on a 30-27-24-21-19-17-15-14-13-12-11-10-9-8-7-6-5-4-3-2 basis for the first twenty places at each round. Only the best six results from the seven rounds could be retained by each driver.

Championship results

Championship name
Whilst the 1988 Australian Formula 2 Championship winner was awarded the CAMS Gold Star, it was not certain at the time that the winner would be officially recognised as the 1988 Australian Champion Driver. Subsequently, however, the Confederation of Australian Motor Sport listed Onslow as the winner of both the 1988 Australian Formula 2 Championship and the 1988 Australian Drivers' Championship.

References

Australian Drivers' Championship
Drivers' Championship
Australian Formula 2